The 16th British Academy Video Game Awards was hosted by the British Academy of Film and Television Arts on 2 April 2020 to honour the best video games of 2019. Though originally planned to be presented at a ceremony at the Queen Elizabeth Hall in London, the event was instead presented as a live stream due to concern over the coronavirus pandemic. The nominees were announced on 3 March 2020, with Control and Death Stranding leading the group with eleven nominations each, breaking the record of ten set by Uncharted 2: Among Thieves, The Last of Us, Everybody's Gone to the Rapture and God of War as the most nominations received by a game.

Category changes
For the 16th BAFTA Game Awards, one new category was added. The Best Animation category covers all elements of animation (including ambient, facial and cinematics) and aims to celebrate the role that animation plays in creating believable and engaging worlds, seeking to complement the already existing Artistic Achievement category. Additionally, the Best Performer category has been expanded and split into two new categories, Performer in a Leading Role and Performance in a Supporting Role, a decision that moves to highlight and recognize the increasing importance of voice over and motion capture performance in video games.

Furthermore, the Game Innovation category has been abolished and assimilated into a new Technical Achievement category which intends to celebrate all elements of gameplay programming and visual engineering. The Mobile Game category has also been retired though the public-voted EE Mobile Game of the Year award remains.

Due to these category changes, the 16th BAFTA Game Awards will feature 18 competitive categories in total.

Presentation
The awards had been planned to be presented at a live ceremony at the  Queen Elizabeth Hall in London on 2 April 2020. However, with the coronavirus pandemic, the Academy opted to forego the live ceremony and instead present the awards through a pre-recorded streamed event via YouTube. Dara Ó Briain, who had been set to host the live event, served as host from his home for the stream, with pre-recorded acceptance speeches for the winners shown.

Winners and nominees 
The nominations were announced on 3 March 2020, and winners named on 2 April.

BAFTA Fellowship: Hideo Kojima

Games with multiple nominations and wins

Nominations

Wins

References

British Academy Games Awards ceremonies
British Academy Games
British Academy Games
British Academy Games
British Academy Games Awards 16